The 2009-10 Irish Ice Hockey League season was the third season of the Irish Ice Hockey League, the top level of ice hockey in Ireland. Five teams participated in the league, and the Charlestown Chiefs won the championship.

Overview
Five teams participated. The season was abandoned partway through, and the Charlestown Chiefs were declared champions.

Regular season

External links
Season on SFRP's Hockey Archive

Irish Ice Hockey League seasons
Irish
ice hockey
ice hockey